Artic is an unincorporated community in Grays Harbor County, in the U.S. state of Washington.

History
A post office called Artic was established in 1887, and remained in operation until 1907. The community was named for Mrs. Arta Saunders (a recording error by postal officials accounts for the error in spelling, which was never corrected).

References

Unincorporated communities in Grays Harbor County, Washington
Unincorporated communities in Washington (state)